Gareth Robert Vincent Stansfield  (born 26 October 1973) is a British academic, currently Professor of Middle East Studies and Al-Qasimi Chair of Arab Gulf Studies at Exeter University.

Biography
Stansfield was educated at Hulme Grammar School, followed by Durham University, where he read Geography and was awarded the W A Moyes Prize. He went on to complete an MA in Middle East Politics and a PhD at the same institution. He joined Exeter as a Research Fellow in 2002.

Stansfield has been critical of Turkish policy in Syria.

References

1973 births
Living people
Academics of the University of Exeter
Middle Eastern studies scholars
Alumni of Hatfield College, Durham
People educated at Oldham Hulme Grammar School